12th Street/Oakland City Center station (signed as 12th St/Oakland) is an underground Bay Area Rapid Transit (BART) station located under Broadway between 12th Street and 14th Street in Downtown Oakland, adjacent to the Oakland City Center.

The station has three underground levels, with tracks on the second and third levels.

Oakland City Center/12th Street station opened in 1972 as part of the first section of BART. In 1980–1986, the KE Track project added the third track to the station. From 1992 to 2002, and 2004 to 2010, it was the timed transfer point between northbound trains. Tempo bus rapid transit service began in 2020.

Station layout 

The station has three underground levels. The first level is a concourse with ticket machines and faregates. The station has red brickwork, contrasting with the blue of nearby 19th Street Oakland station.

The station has eight public entrances: two at 12th Street, three at 13th Street, and two at 14th Street (including one from Frank H. Ogawa Plaza), plus one from the belowground plaza of Oakland City Center near 13th Street. Surface elevators are located at the Ogawa Plaza entrance and at the southwest 12th Street entrance, while the platform elevator is at the south end of the station. A currently unused passage leads directly to the Central Building at the north end of the station.

History 

By 1967, owners of three Oakland buildings were considering paying for private entrances from the station mezzanine. Only one was actually constructed: an entrance from the Central Building (1400 Broadway) was approved in February 1968.

The station opened on September 11, 1972, as part of the first section of BART to open; service was extended to Richmond the next year. Service to Concord was added on May 21, 1973, and extended to San Francisco through the Transbay Tube on September 16, 1974. Richmond–San Francisco service was added on April 19, 1976.

The station initially had one side platform on each level, with one track on the east side of each platform. The KE Track project, begun in 1980 and completed on March 17, 1986, converted the upper platform to an island platform with a new west track (Track CX). The new track was originally used for peak hour service (southbound towards San Francisco in the morning, and northbound in the evening).

Schedule changes on June 22, 1992, introduced timed transfers between Richmond–Fremont line and Concord–Daly City line trains. Oakland City Center/12th Street was the transfer point between northbound (Richmond-bound and Concord-bound) trains, while MacArthur station was the transfer point between southbound trains. Timed transfers were discontinued in 2002, but resumed on February 9, 2004. Four of the six entrances were closed from April 13, 2020, to June 12, 2021, due to low ridership during the COVID-19 pandemic.

The station was renamed to 12th Street Oakland City Center around 2008. On September 13, 2010, the northbound transfer location was changed to 19th Street Oakland station. Sunday-only service to the station on the Dublin/Pleasanton line was operated from February 11, 2019, to February 10, 2020, due to construction work in the Transbay Tube.

Construction of the Oakland–San Leandro East Bay Bus Rapid Transit line (later branded Tempo) began in August 2016. Tempo route 1T service began on August 9, 2020, with surface stations at 14th Street and City Center.

Bus connections 

Downtown Oakland is a major transfer point for AC Transit buses, which stop at various locations on Broadway and cross streets near the station:
Broadway Shuttle: Day and Night
Rapid: 1T, 72R
Local: 6, 12, 14, 18, 19, 20, 29, 33, 40, 51A, 72, 72M, 88, 96
All-Nighter: 1T, 840, 851

Route 1T stops at dedicated platforms at two locations: 14th Street on Broadway at the north end of the station, and City Center just east of Broadway on 12th Street (northbound) and 11th Street (southbound) at the south end of the station.

References

External links 

BART – 12th St. Oakland City Center

Bay Area Rapid Transit stations in Alameda County, California
Stations on the Orange Line (BART)
Stations on the Yellow Line (BART)
Stations on the Red Line (BART)
Railway stations in Oakland, California
Railway stations in the United States opened in 1972